The Governors are the Executive authorities of each Dominican Province.

List of Governors

External links 
Government Official Website (in Spanish)

References 

Dominican governors
Dominican Republic
Governors